Li Hongyang (born May 16, 1990 in Guilin, Guangxi) is a Chinese rhythmic gymnast. Li Hongyang debuted at the 2006 Chinese National Rhythmic Gymnastics Championships, where she won the championship trophy. In 2007, she won the 2007 National Championships in the individual/group, and placed 8th in the team competition at the 2007 World Rhythmic Gymnastics Championships. She represented China at the 2008 Summer Olympics. In 2009, she retired from professional rhythmic gymnastics following the 2009 Rhythmic Gymnastics World Championships.

Rhythmic Gymnastics Career

National Championships 
2006 Chinese National Rhythmic Gymnastics Championships (Shenyang, China)

2007 Chinese National Rhythmic Gymnastics Championships

World Championships 
2007 Rhythmic Gymnastics World Championships (Patras, Greece)

2009 Rhythmic Gymnastics World Championships (Mie, Japan)

Olympic Games 
2008 Summer Olympics (Beijing, China)

References

1990 births
Living people
Chinese rhythmic gymnasts
Gymnasts at the 2008 Summer Olympics
Olympic gymnasts of China
Gymnasts from Guangxi
People from Guilin
Asian Games medalists in gymnastics
Gymnasts at the 2006 Asian Games
Asian Games bronze medalists for China
Medalists at the 2006 Asian Games
21st-century Chinese women